Walter Joseph Hickel (August 18, 1919 – May 7, 2010) was an American businessman, real estate developer, and politician who served as the second governor of Alaska from 1966 to 1969 and 1990 to 1994 and as U.S. Secretary of the Interior from 1969 to 1970. He worked as a construction worker and eventually became a construction company owner/operator during Alaska's territorial days. Following World War II, Hickel became heavily involved with real estate development, building residential subdivisions, shopping centers and hotels. Hickel entered politics in the 1950s during Alaska's battle for statehood and remained politically active for the rest of his life.

Hickel served as the second governor of Alaska, defeating incumbent and first governor William A. Egan in 1966. He served as governor until 1969, ending with his resignation upon his appointment to the position of United States Secretary of the Interior in the cabinet of President Richard Nixon. Hickel later served a full term as governor from 1990 to 1994 under the banner of the Alaskan Independence Party.

Early life and career
Hickel was born in 1919 in Ellinwood, Kansas, the son of Emma Pauline (Zecha) and Robert Anton Hickel. He grew up on his parents' Dust Bowl tenant farm during the Great Depression near Claflin, Kansas. In October 1940 he moved to Alaska and traveled to it aboard the S.S. Yukon with 95 other passengers and went into the local real estate industry. Seven years later in 1947 he had founded a successful construction company.

Hickel joined Democrats in calling for Alaskan statehood during the late 1940s and into the 1950s. In 1958, the Alaska Statehood Act was signed into law by President Dwight D. Eisenhower.

Political career

1950s

By the 1950s he was the finance chairman of the Republican Party and in 1952 received the backing of businessmen in Anchorage for the territorial governorship, but Benjamin Heintzleman was appointed instead. In 1953 Hickel along with the national committeewoman for Alaska, the vice chairman for the territorial party, and his wife went to the Republican Party's western conference in San Francisco and was later elected as head of the Anchorage Republican Club. In December 1953 he and eighteen other prominent Republicans from Anchorage sent a letter to Governor Heintzleman requesting for the resignation of Robert DeArmond and to replace him with somebody from Anchorage and later telegrammed Secretary of the Intertior Douglas McKay asking him to build up the party and also asked Heintzleman to reconsider his decision to cancel his meeting with them.

First governorship

Hickel was elected as Alaska's second governor in the 1966 state general elections, defeating his Democratic rival and incumbent governor Bill Egan. Hickel's first governorship, the second in the young state's history as well as Alaska's first Republican governorship, oversaw the discovery of oilfields at Prudhoe Bay in 1968, a factor that would prove politically decisive in later years. Hickel, a moderate Republican and environmentalist, did not push for heavy oil exploitation. Nevertheless, during his first few months in office, his administration approved the sale of oil leases on 37,000 acres of the North Slope despite opposition from Alaskan Natives. In November 1968, Hickel's department of transportation began construction on a 400-mile road from Livengood to Prudhoe Bay that would later be known as the Hickel Highway. The same year, Hickel appointed Ted Stevens to the United States Senate to replace the recently deceased Bob Bartlett.

Like his predecessor Egan, Hickel sought to improve relations with Alaskan Natives in seeking resolutions on Native land claims. A group of Native Americans from Interior Alaska, including Morris Thompson and Don and Jules Wright, played major roles in his 1966 campaign and subsequent governorship.

Interior secretary

Richard Nixon's election as U.S. President in late 1968 led to an offer to Hickel from the President-elect to serve in the United States Cabinet as Interior Secretary. Initially, Hickel declined the cabinet offer. Nixon replied that his decision was final. Hickel would recall years later that he cried afterward and announced that he would be resigning from the governorship to go to Washington.

Hickel's nomination was met with what he later wrote was a newspaper "smear" campaign of false and "crazy accusations" that he had a corrupt and anti-environmentalist record as governor. Opposition to his nomination was led by influential columnists Drew Pearson and Jack Anderson.  Newspapers opposing his nomination included the New York Times and the Los Angeles Times. In the Senate, his confirmation was opposed by, among others, Democratic senators Walter Mondale and George McGovern. Sierra Club director David Brower testified in opposition to Hickel. The Senate nevertheless confirmed his nomination on 23 January 1969.

Upon becoming the federal Secretary of the Interior, Hickel proved to be a strong environmentalist, supporting strong legislation that put liabilities on oil companies operating offshore oil rigs as well as demanding environmental safeguards on Alaska's growing oil industry.

Hickel's centrist voice inside the Nixon Administration eventually led to confrontations with the President. In 1970 following the shooting of college students at Kent State University by the Ohio National Guard, Hickel wrote a letter critical of Nixon's Vietnam War policy and urging him to give more respect to the views of young people critical of the war, writing in part, "I believe this administration finds itself today embracing a philosophy which appears to lack appropriate concern for the attitude of a great mass of Americans – our young people." That dissent garnered worldwide media attention, and on November 25, 1970, Hickel was fired over the letter. Days before he lost the office, Hickel had told CBS' 60 Minutes that he would not quit under pressure and that he would go away only "with an arrow in my heart, not a bullet in my back." Hickel's undersecretaries, such as Leslie Glasgow, who was in charge of Fish, Wildlife, Parks, and Marine Resources, were also dismissed. After less than two years in Washington, Glasgow returned to Louisiana State University in Baton Rouge, where he was a professor with expertise in the study of wildlife in the marshes.

Second governorship

A blanket primary held on August 28, 1990, resulted in Arliss Sturgulewski, a member of the Alaska Senate from Anchorage since 1979, winning the Republican nomination for governor of Alaska. Winning the Democratic nomination was Tony Knowles, the immediate past mayor of Anchorage.

The Republicans chose as their nominee for lieutenant governor Jack Coghill, a fellow state senator from Nenana.  Coghill had held elected office continuously since 1957 with the exception of relinquishing the mayorship of Nenana for approximately two years, when the 1967 flood forced him to move from the city limits temporarily. Coghill had also briefly worked as a special assistant to Hickel during his first governorship.

Sturgulewski, who won the Republican nomination for the second consecutive time against mostly conservative opposition, was criticized by many Republicans for her positions on issues such as abortion and capital punishment. Following a contentious meeting between Sturgulewski and prominent conservative Republicans held in the home of David Cuddy, Coghill felt that it was impossible to continue to run on the ticket with Sturgulewski. After Coghill met first with Hickel and then with Edgar Paul Boyko, the idea was hatched to run a slate of Hickel and Coghill under the Alaskan Independence Party banner.  AIP chairman Joe Vogler was brought from Fairbanks to Anchorage immediately prior to the deadline for political parties to substitute their nominees.

John Lindauer and Jerry Ward, who had been chosen in the primary as the AIP ticket (and would, eight years later, win another blanket primary as the Republican Party's nominees for governor and lieutenant governor), stepped aside, largely alluding to the illness of Lindauer's wife as the reason. Hickel and Coghill prevailed in the general election.

Although he had common ground with the Alaskan Independence Party in fighting restrictions on land use imposed by federal environmentalism, Hickel had been one of the most influential historical proponents of Alaska statehood and never endorsed the AIP's secessionism, prompting some party faithful to petition for his recall. He rejoined the Republican Party in April 1994, near the end of his term.

Hickel wanted to build a water pipeline from Alaska to California in 1991.

Business career

Wally Hickel was a prominent real estate developer and successful businessman, with a focus on hotels and shopping centers. As chairman of the Hickel Investment Company, he oversaw the construction and operation of numerous properties, including those built to house Safeway's initial stores in Alaska.

In 1964, Hickel decided to build a high-rise luxury hotel in downtown Anchorage following the devastating 1964 Alaska earthquake. Despite skepticism that the area could not be redeveloped extensively, he chose a site close to one of the largest landslides in the area as a show of confidence in the city's future. The result was the Hotel Captain Cook, a nine-story luxury hotel that opened in 1965 on Fourth Avenue, adjacent to the historic Wendler Building.

Hickel's confidence in the project was not misplaced, as the hotel grew to become a major landmark in Anchorage. A fifteen-story tower was added in 1972, followed by an eighteen-story tower in 1978. Today, the Hotel Captain Cook covers almost an entire city block and includes a connected parking garage covering another half-block. 

Overall, Hickel's business career was marked by a commitment to development that balanced economic growth with environmental responsibility. His success as a businessman provided him with the resources and platform to pursue public service and activism, where he continued to advocate for sustainable development and environmental protection.

Later life

In 2006 he supported Sarah Palin in her bid to become governor of Alaska; however, in 2009, he stated that he didn't "give a damn what she does".

In 2008, he called for the resignation of U.S. Senator Ted Stevens, whom he had appointed to the Senate in 1968. His statement was made in light of the August 2008 federal indictment of Stevens related to the alleged receipt of improper gifts from Bill Allen, CEO of the VECO Corporation, an Alaskan construction company heavily involved in the Alaskan oil industry. Stevens was found guilty by a Washington D.C. jury of seven felonies in October 2008, narrowly losing his November election to Democrat Mark Begich, eight days later. Stevens' conviction was later set aside by the federal trial judge over the issue of prosecutorial misconduct. The Justice Department under Eric Holder declined to refile charges against the ex-Senator.

Death
Hickel died on May 7, 2010, in Anchorage, Alaska. In keeping with his often-stated wish, he was buried standing up, facing east towards Washington, D.C.

See also

List of governors of Alaska
Ermalee Hickel
Jack Hickel

References

Bibliography
  328 pp.
  132 pp.
  239 pp.
  290 pp.

External links

 Alaska's Digital Archives – Passport photo of Walter Hickel, 1961
 Interview with Hickel by Headwaters News
 KTVA: Former Gov. Wally Hickel Dies of Natural Causes at 90

|-

|-

|-

|-

1919 births
2010 deaths
Alaskan Independence Party politicians
Alaskan Independence Party state governors of the United States
American construction businesspeople
American hoteliers
American real estate businesspeople
Businesspeople from Anchorage, Alaska
Republican Party governors of Alaska
Knights of Malta
Nixon administration cabinet members
20th-century American politicians
Politicians from Anchorage, Alaska
People from Barton County, Kansas
Military personnel from Kansas
United States Secretaries of the Interior
Writers from Anchorage, Alaska